The Interstate Highways in Texas are all owned and maintained by the U.S. state of Texas. The Texas Department of Transportation (TxDOT) is the agency responsible for the day-to-day maintenance and operations of the Interstate Highways in Texas.

The construction of the Interstate Highway System in Texas began well before these routes were designated as Interstate Highways.  A  stretch of I-45 between Galveston and Houston was opened in 1951, eight years before it was designated I-45. It was also the first urban expressway in Texas. In 1962,  of I-35 opened in Bexar County, the first section of Interstate Highway to open from county line to county line in a large metropolitan area.  Portions of I-10 west of San Antonio took much longer to complete due to the vast open spaces and lack of nearby labor.  The majority of the construction of this section of I-10 occurred in the 1970s and 1980s and was complete by the early 1990s. The section east of San Antonio was completed 20 years earlier in 1972.  The opening of a  section of I-27 in 1992 completed the Interstate Highway System in Texas.

Planning is ongoing for a proposed extension of I-69 southward from its original terminus in Indiana through Texas to the United States–Mexico border. The first  portion was approved in 2011, with signage posted December 6, 2011.

Primary Interstate Highways

Auxiliary Interstate Highways

Business Interstate Highways

See also

Notes

References

External links
Texas Department of Transportation
Texas Highway Man

 
Interstate